The Vanuatu women's national under-17 football team is the second highest women's youth team of women's football in Vanuatu and is controlled by the Vanuatu Football Federation.

History
Vanuatu participated only one time so far in the OFC U-17 Women's Championship. That was in 2016. They lost two games, but won a game against Fiji. Either, two days earlier they already scored their first goal, in a 7–1 defeat against Papua New Guinea. The goal was scored by Annie Gere. She also was one of the goalscorers against Fiji which means that she is Vanuatu's top scorer with two goals.

OFC
The OFC Women's Under 17 Qualifying Tournament is a tournament held once every two years to decide the only qualification spot for Oceania Football Confederation (OFC) and representatives at the FIFA U-17 World Cup.

Current squad

References

External links
Vanuatu Football Federation page
Oceania Football Federation page

Women's national under-17 association football teams
women's